Líkasum is a 1986 poetry collection by Faroese poet Rói Patursson. It won the Nordic Council's Literature Prize in 1986.

References

1986 poetry books
Faroese poetry
Nordic Council's Literature Prize-winning works
Poetry collections